The 1961 Soviet football championship was the 29th seasons of competitive football in the Soviet Union and the 23rd among teams of sports societies and factories. Dinamo won the championship becoming the Soviet domestic champions for the first time.

Honours

Notes = Number in parentheses is the times that club has won that honour. * indicates new record for competition

Soviet Union football championship

Class A (second stage)

Places 1–10

Places 11–22

Promotion/relegation Tournament

Class B

Russian Federation finals
 [Oct 24 – Nov 5, Krasnodar]

Ukraine (playoffs)
For places 1-2
 Chernomorets Odessa  2-1 0-0 SKA Odessa

Union republics finals
 no finals
 Torpedo Kutaisi and Lokomotiv Tbilisi qualified for promotion playoffs as two group winners

Top goalscorers

Class A
Gennadiy Gusarov (Torpedo Moscow) – 22 goals

References

External links
 1961 Soviet football championship. RSSSF